The Aisch is an 83 km long tributary of the Regnitz in Middle- and Upper Franconia, in the state of Bavaria in southern Germany. It passes through Bad Windsheim, Neustadt an der Aisch and Höchstadt, and flows into the Regnitz near Altendorf.

References

Rivers of Bavaria
Rivers of Germany